Badriia Ines "Bibi" Bourelly (born July 14, 1994) is a German-Born American singer-songwriter signed to Def Jam Recordings. She has co-written several notable songs including Rihanna's "Bitch Better Have My Money" and "Higher", Demi Lovato's "Anyone" and Nick Brewer's "Talk to Me". Bourelly is featured on tracks such as Lil Wayne's "Without You", and Usher's "Chains" She also released two singles in 2015 ("Riot" and "Ego")
in 2018 she released her first single "Writer's Song" in preparation for the release of her debut studio album later in 2018.

Early life
Badriia Ines Bourelly was born in Berlin, Germany and is of Haitian and Moroccan descent. Her father, Jean-Paul Bourelly, is a notable guitarist and her late mother was the head of the Art Department at Berlin's House of the World’s Cultures. Because her father was a professional musician, Bourelly often attended concerts and wrote songs as young as age four. Her mother died when Bourelly was six years old. She first went on tour with her father when she was 11. She attended Blake High School in Maryland until the 12th grade, graduating in August 2013 after completing summer school. Bourelly has stated she has German and American citizenship.

Career
While still living in Maryland, Bourelly began working with producer, Paperboy Fabe. He would later arrange for her to have a session with Kanye West in Los Angeles. That session ultimately produced Rihanna's "Higher", which Bourelly wrote in about 30 minutes. Around the same time, Rihanna heard another of Bourelly's written songs, "Bitch Better Have My Money", and decided to make it the lead single off her 2016 album, Anti.

In April 2015, Bourelly released her first single, "Riot", a song that discusses Bourelly's wish to be recognized as an "authentic" and legitimate musician. In July 2015, she was featured on Lil Wayne's "Without You", which appeared on his Free Weezy Album. A month later, she was featured in (and co-wrote) Nick Brewer's "Talk to Me". She also co-wrote (with Chris Braide) Selena Gomez's "Camouflage" from her album, Revival, and was featured in Usher's single, "Chains", alongside Nas. She performed the latter song with Usher and Nas at the TIDAL X Concert in October 2015.

In October 2015, Bourelly released another single entitled, "Ego". The song made it onto the Spotify Viral Charts for several nations, peaking at No. 2 in the US, No. 8 in the UK, and No. 4 on the overall global charts. The song has been described as a "powerful, unapologetic ballad to self confidence". The music video for "Ego" was filmed in Bourelly's hometown of Berlin and was directed by Branwen Okpako.

In March 2016, the third single, "Sally" was released accompanied by an interactive video. She made her television debut on the NBC Tonight Show with Jimmy Fallon. In the summer of 2016, Bourelly toured with Haim and Rihanna prior to going on her solo "Free The Real" tour in North America. She was also featured in the well-known Women Who Dare campaign by Harper's Bazaar alongside Hillary Clinton, Iskra Lawrence, and Uma Thurman.

Discography

EPs

Singles

As lead artist

As featured artist

Guest appearances

Songwriting credits

References

Living people
1994 births
Def Jam Recordings artists
German singer-songwriters
German people of Haitian descent
German people of Moroccan descent
Singers from Berlin
21st-century German women singers